Per Täckenström (born 4 April 1963) is a Swedish fencer. He competed in the team foil event at the 1988 Summer Olympics.

References

External links
 

1963 births
Living people
Swedish male foil fencers
Olympic fencers of Sweden
Fencers at the 1988 Summer Olympics
Sportspeople from Stockholm